Karachay Autonomous Oblast was an autonomous oblast in the Soviet Union created on 26 April 1926. It was formed by the split of the Karachay-Cherkess Autonomous Oblast in 1926, creating Karachay and Cherkess Autonomous Oblast. Karachay Autonomous Oblast was dissolved during World War II, when the Karachay people were exiled to Central Asia for their alleged collaboration with the Germans. During this time, part of the territory was incorporated into the Georgian SSR. In 1957 it and the Cherkess Autonomous Oblast merged to reinstate the Karachay-Cherkess Autonomous Oblast.

References 

1926 establishments in the Soviet Union
1957 disestablishments in the Soviet Union
Autonomous oblasts of the Soviet Union
History of Karachay-Cherkessia
States and territories established in 1926
States and territories disestablished in 1957